A Model Family is a South Korean streaming television series directed by Kim Jin-woo. Starring Jung Woo, Park Hee-soon, Yoon Jin-seo, and Park Ji-yeon. The series depicts the journey of realizing the importance of family and finally becoming a model family against drug gangs. It was released on August 12, 2022 on Netflix.

Synopsis 
After unwittingly stealing money from a cartel, a cash-strapped professor finds the only way to save his broken family is by working as a drug courier.

Cast

Main 
 Jung Woo as Dong-ha
 Park Hee-soon as Gwang-cheol
 Yoon Jin-seo as Eun-joo
 Park Ji-yeon as Joo-hyun

Supporting 
 Kim Sung-oh as Choi Kang-jun, the new face of a drug gang whose eyes show madness.
 Won Hyun-jun
 Kim Shin-bi as Oh Jae-chan
 Park Doo-shik as Min-gyu, is a member of Gwangcheol's group.
 Shin Eun-soo as Yeon-woo
 Seok Min-gi as Hyun-woo
 Heo Jin-na
 Oh Kwang-rok
 Moon Jin-seung

Special appearance 
 Heo Sung-tae as Ma Sa-jang, Dong-ha's first drug delivery recipient.
 Kim Joo-hun as Yoo Han-cheol

Production

Casting 
In January 2021 it was reported that Jung Woo was considering to appear in the series. In April 2021 it was reported that Park Hee-soon will joined the cast replacing the role of So Ji-sub, who is known to have declined his appearance. On August 31, 2021, they were officially joined by Yoon Jin-seo and Park Ji-yeon, casting lineup was announced by releasing photos.

References

External links 
 
 
 

Korean-language Netflix original programming
South Korean crime television series
South Korean web series
South Korean thriller television series
2022 South Korean television series debuts
Television series by Celltrion Entertainment